The 57th & 9th Tour is a world tour by British singer-songwriter Sting, in support of his twelfth solo studio album 57th & 9th. The tour began on February 1, 2017, at the Commodore Ballroom in Vancouver and continued until October of that year.

DVD/Bluray release
The Paris tour date was filmed and released as a DVD and Bluray, Sting: Live at the Olympia Paris.

Setlists

North America Leg 1
 "Heading South on the Great North Road"                                                   
 "Synchronicity II"
 "Spirits in the Material World"
 "Englishman in New York"
 "I Can't Stop Thinking About You"
 "She's Too Good for Me"
 "One Fine Day"
 "I Hung My Head"
 "Fields of Gold"
 "Down, Down, Down"
 "Petrol Head"
 "Shape of My Heart"
 "Pretty Young Soldier"
 "Message in a Bottle"
 "Ashes to Ashes" (sung by Joe Sumner)
 "50,000"
 "Walking on the Moon"
 "So Lonely"
 "Desert Rose"
 "Roxanne" / "Ain't No Sunshine"
 "Next to You"
 "Every Breath You Take"
 "The Empty Chair"

Songs played occasionally:
 "I'm So Happy I Can't Stop Crying"
 "All This Time"
 "Fragile"

Europe Leg 2
 "Heading South on the Great North Road"                                                   
 "Synchronicity II"
 "Spirits in the Material World"
 "Englishman in New York"
 "I Can't Stop Thinking About You"
 "One Fine Day"
 "She's Too Good for Me"
 "I Hung My Head"
 "Fields of Gold"
 "Down, Down, Down"
 "Petrol Head"
 "Shape of My Heart"
 "Pretty Young Soldier"
 "Message in a Bottle"
 "Ashes to Ashes" (sung by Joe Sumner)
 "50,000 ('17)"
 "Walking on the Moon"
 "So Lonely"
 "Desert Rose"
 "Roxanne" / "Ain't No Sunshine"
 "Next to You"
 "Every Breath You Take"
 "Fragile"

Latin America Leg
 "Synchronicity II"
 "Spirits in the Material World"
 "Englishman in New York"
 "I Can't Stop Thinking About You"
 "One Fine Day"
 "She's Too Good for Me"
 "I Hung My Head"
 "Fields of Gold"
 "Petrol Head"
 "Down, Down, Down"
 "Shape of My Heart"
 "Message in a Bottle"
 "Ashes to Ashes" (sung by Joe Sumner)
 "50,000 ('17)"
 "Walking on the Moon"
 "So Lonely"
 "Desert Rose"
 "Roxanne" / "Ain't No Sunshine"
 "Next to You"
 "Every Breath You Take"
 "Fragile"

Songs played occasionally:
 "Seven Days"
 "Pretty Young Soldier"
 "Every Little Thing She Does Is Magic"

Asia Leg
 "Synchronicity II"
 "Spirits in the Material World"
 "Englishman in New York"
 "I Can't Stop Thinking About You"
 "Every Little Thing She Does Is Magic"
 "One Fine Day"
 "She's Too Good for Me"
 "Fields of Gold"
 "Petrol Head"
 "Down, Down, Down"
 "Shape of My Heart"
 "Message in a Bottle"
 "Ashes to Ashes" (sung by Joe Sumner)
 "50,000 ('17)"
 "Walking on the Moon"
 "So Lonely"
 "Desert Rose"
 "Roxanne" / "Ain't No Sunshine"
 "Next to You"
 "Every Breath You Take"
 "Fragile"

Songs played occasionally:
 "Seven Days"
 "Mad About You"
 "Heading South on the Great North Road"

Europe Leg 2
 "Synchronicity II"
 "If I Ever Lose My Faith in You"
 "Spirits in the Material World"
 "Englishman in New York"
 "Every Little Thing She Does Is Magic"
 "She's Too Good for Me"
 "Mad About You"
 "Fields of Gold"
 "Shape of My Heart"
 "Petrol Head"
 "One Fine Day"
 "Message in a Bottle"
 "Ashes to Ashes" (sung by Joe Sumner)
 "50,000 ('17)"
 "Walking on the Moon"
 "So Lonely"
 "Desert Rose"
 "Roxanne" / "Ain't No Sunshine"
 "Next to You"
 "I Can't Stop Thinking About You"
 "Every Breath You Take"
 "Fragile"

Songs played occasionally:
 "Driven to Tears"
 "Down, Down, Down"
 "Heading South on the Great North Road"

North American Leg 2
 "Heading South on the Great North Road"    
 "Synchronicity II"
 "If I Ever Lose My Faith in You"
 "Spirits in the Material World"
 "Englishman in New York"
 "Every Little Thing She Does Is Magic"
 "She's Too Good for Me"
 "Mad About You"
 "Fields of Gold"
 "Shape of My Heart"
 "Petrol Head"
 "One Fine Day"
 "Message in a Bottle"
 "Ashes to Ashes" (sung by Joe Sumner)
 "50,000 ('17)"
 "Walking on the Moon"
 "So Lonely"
 "Desert Rose"
 "Roxanne" / "Ain't No Sunshine"
 "Next to You"
 "I Can't Stop Thinking About You"
 "Every Breath You Take"
 "Fragile"

Songs played occasionally:
 "Seven Days"

Europe Leg 3
 "Heading South on the Great North Road"    
 "Synchronicity II"
 "If I Ever Lose My Faith in You"
 "Spirits in the Material World"
 "Englishman in New York"
 "Every Little Thing She Does Is Magic"
 "Mad About You"
 "Fields of Gold"
 "Shape of My Heart"
 "Petrol Head"
 "She's Too Good for Me"
 "Message in a Bottle"
 "Ashes to Ashes" (sung by Joe Sumner)
 "50,000 ('17)"
 "Walking on the Moon"
 "So Lonely"
 "Desert Rose"
 "Roxanne" / "Ain't No Sunshine"
 "Next to You"
 "I Can't Stop Thinking About You"
 "Every Breath You Take"
 "Fragile"

Songs played occasionally:
 "Seven Days"
 "One Fine Day"
 "De Do Do Do, De Da Da Da"

Personnel

 Sting – vocals, bass, rhythm guitar 
 Dominic Miller – lead and rhythm guitar, backing vocals 
 Rufus Miller - lead and rhythm guitars, bass, backing vocals
 Josh Freese - drums, percussion
 Joe Sumner - rhythm guitar, bass, vocals, percussion
 Jerry Fuentes - backing vocals, percussion (North American, European Leg 1, Latin American & Asian Legs Only)
 Diego Navaira - backing vocals (North American, European Leg 1, Latin American & Asian Legs Only)
 Derek James - backing vocals, percussion on "She's Too Good for Me" & "Every Breath You Take" (North American, European Leg 1, Latin American & Asian Legs Only)
 Emilio Navaira IV - backing vocals, percussion on "She's Too Good for Me", "Desert Rose" & "Every Breath You Take" (North American, European Leg 1, Latin American & Asian Legs Only)
 Percy Cardona - Squeezebox, backing vocals, percussion
 Ben Thornewill - backing vocals, percussion (European Leg 2 Only)

Tour dates

References

2017 concert tours